This article refers to crime in the U.S. state of Rhode Island.

State statistics
In 2014 there were 25,248 crimes reported, including 25 murders.

Capital punishment laws

Capital punishment is not applied in this state.

References